This is a list of notable individuals and organizations who voiced their endorsement of Donald Trump as the Republican Party's presidential nominee for the 2016 U.S. presidential election.

Primary campaign endorsements

Former Executive Branch officials

 Gary Berntsen, former officer of the Central Intelligence Agency Directorate of Operations (1982–2005)
 Pat Buchanan, White House Communications Director (1985–1987), senior advisor to Richard Nixon and Gerald Ford, author, and columnist
 Jeffrey D. Gordon, retired United States Navy officer, communications and foreign policy adviser, and Pentagon spokesman from (2005–2009)
 Michael Johns, former White House speechwriter to President George H. W. Bush and co-founder and national leader of the U.S. Tea Party movement
 Jeffrey Lord, White House associate political director for the Reagan administration (1987–1988) and political commentator
 Joseph E. Schmitz, Inspector General of the Department of Defense (2002–2005), former executive with Blackwater Worldwide, and member of the foreign policy advising committee for the Trump campaign.

U.S. Senators

Current (as of endorsement)
 Jeff Sessions of Alabama

Former
 Scott Brown of Massachusetts
 Jeffrey Chiesa of New Jersey
 Bob Kasten of Wisconsin

U.S. Representatives
Current

 Lou Barletta of Pennsylvania (previously endorsed Rick Santorum)
 Chris Collins of New York (previously endorsed Jeb Bush)
 Jim Renacci of Ohio
 Scott DesJarlais of Tennessee
 Jimmy Duncan of Tennessee
 Renee Ellmers of North Carolina
 Duncan D. Hunter of California
 Tom Marino of Pennsylvania
 Jeff Miller of Florida, also Chairman of the House Veterans' Affairs Committee
 Tom Reed of New York (previously endorsed Jeb Bush)
 Bill Shuster of Pennsylvania, also Chairman of the House Transportation Committee

Former
 Virgil Goode of Virginia (also Constitutional Party presidential nominee in 2012)
 Bob Livingston of Louisiana
 Doug Ose of California

Retired U.S. Armed Forces members
 Michael T. Flynn, retired U.S. Lieutenant General, director of the U.S. Defense Intelligence Agency (2012–2014), commander of the Joint Functional Component Command for Intelligence, Surveillance and Reconnaissance, and foreign policy adviser to the Trump campaign
 Bert Mizusawa, retired U.S. Army Major General, former Deputy Director for Strategic Initiatives, Joint Chiefs of Staff, former commander of the Combined Joint Interagency Task Force-Afghanistan (CJIATF-A), and adviser to the Trump campaign
 Robert C. Oaks, retired U.S. Air Force General, commander of Air Training Command and United States Air Forces in Europe (1986–1990), former Senior Vice President of U.S. Airways, and general authority of the Church of Jesus Christ of Latter-day Saints
 Paul E. Vallely, retired U.S. Army Major General, 351st Civil Affairs Commander (1982–1986), former Deputy Commanding General, Pacific Command, co-author of Endgame: The Blueprint for Victory in the War on Terror, and Military Committee Chairman for the Center for Security Policy

State governors
Current

 Chris Christie, New Jersey (former 2016 presidential candidate)
 Paul LePage, Maine (previously endorsed Chris Christie)
 Rick Scott, Florida

Territorial governors
 Ralph Torres, Northern Mariana Islands

Former

 Jan Brewer, Arizona
 Donald DiFrancesco, New Jersey (previously endorsed Chris Christie)
 Sarah Palin, Alaska (former 2008 vice presidential candidate)

State officials
Current
 Pam Bondi, Attorney General of Florida (previously endorsed Jeb Bush)
 Henry McMaster, Lt. Governor of South Carolina
 Eric Skrmetta, Louisiana Public Service Commissioner

Former
 André Bauer, Lieutenant Governor of South Carolina

State legislators
Current
 Alabama State Representatives: Ed Henry,
 Connecticut State Representative: Anthony D'Amelio
 Florida State Representative: Matt Gaetz
 Georgia State Senators: Burt Jones, Michael Williams
 Iowa State Senator: Brad Zaun
 Massachusetts State Representative: Geoff Diehl
 Michigan State Senators: Jack Brandenburg, and Joe Hune
 Mississippi State Representatives: Becky Currie, Alex Monsour, Margaret Rogers, Gary Chism, Gary Staples
 Nebraska State Senators: Beau McCoy and Tommy Garrett
 Nevada State Assemblyman: Brent A. Jones
 New Hampshire State Representatives: Fred Doucette, Werner Horn, Joe Pitre, Stephen Stepanek (Deputy Majority Leader), Dan Tamburello, Joshua Whitehouse, Al Baldasaro, Sue DeLemus, Tracy Emerick, Peter Varney, Dan Itse, Jeffrey Oligny, Joe Duarte, David Wood, Robert Luther, Gary Azarian, John J. Manning Jr., Steven Woitkun, Elisabeth Sanders
 New Jersey State Senators: Michael J. Doherty, Joe Pennacchio
 Pennsylvania State Representative Mike Vereb
 South Carolina State Representatives:  James H. Merrill (former Majority Leader), Mike Ryhal
 Utah State Representative: Greg Hughes (Speaker)
 Washington State Senators: Don Benton
 West Virginia State Senators: Donna J. Boley, Bill Cole (President)
 West Virginia State Delegates: Randy Smith, Ron Walters, Ray Canterbury, Joshua Nelson

Former
 Arizona State Senators: Lori Klein, Thayer Verschoor
 Georgia State Representative: Charlice Byrd
 Idaho State Representative: Phil Hart
 Louisiana State Representative: Stephen L. Gunn (Independent)
 Louisiana State Representative: Woody Jenkins
 Louisiana State Senator: Troy Hebert
 New Hampshire State Senators: Frank Sapareto, Dick Ferdinando
 New Hampshire State Representatives: Jenn Coffey and Paula Johnson, Laurie Pettengill, John Hikel, Lou Gargiulo, Tom Boriso, George Lambert, Tom Boriso
 South Carolina State Senators:  Jake Knotts
 West Virginia State Senator: Vic Sprouse

Mayors and other municipal or county leaders
Current

 Joe Arpaio, sheriff of Maricopa County, Arizona
 Joseph Borelli, Council member for the 51st District of the New York City Council
 Mary Hawkins Butler, Mayor of Madison, Mississippi
 Arnaldo Ferraro, Republican Party chairman of Kings County, New York
 Tim Howard, Erie County Sheriff
 Ed Mangano, County Executive of Nassau County, New York
 Joseph Mondello, Republican Party chairman of Nassau County, New York
 Bill Reilich, Supervisor of the Town of Greece, New York
 Corey Stewart, Chairman of the Prince William Board of County Supervisors
 Keith Summey, mayor of North Charleston, South Carolina

Former
 Greg Edwards, former Chautauqua County Executive
 Charles Evers, former Mayor of Fayette, Mississippi, civil rights activist and brother of the late (first black mayor of Mississippi) Medgar Evers
 Rudy Giuliani, former mayor of New York City, New York
 Vincent Ignizio, Council member for the 51st District of the New York City Council
 Tom Leppert, former Mayor of Dallas, Texas

Businesspeople

 Thomas J. Barrack, Jr., Founder and Chairman of Colony Capital
 Andrew Beal, Founder and Chairman of Beal Bank
 Bernard Brscic, Slovenian neo-liberal economist
 Bernie Ecclestone, Formula One Group Chief Executive
 Marc Faber, Swiss investor
 Brian France, CEO and Chairman of NASCAR
 Harold Hamm, billionaire,  entrepreneur, and oil and gas industry pioneer
 Carl Icahn, billionaire activist investor
 Robert Kiyosaki, businessman and author (authored two business books with the candidate)
 Charles Kushner, real estate developer and co-owner of Kushner Properties
 Jared Kushner, co-owner of Kushner Properties, owner of The New York Observer, son-in-law of the candidate
 Erik Laykin, author, international cybersecurity expert and co-chair of LA Trump
 Nancy Mace, businesswoman and author
 Carl Paladino, real estate mogul, Chairman of the Ellicott Development Co., Buffalo Public Schools board of education member, 2010 New York gubernatorial candidate
 Willie Robertson, CEO of Duck Commander, star of Duck Dynasty (previously endorsed Bobby Jindal)
 Wayne Allyn Root, businessman, politician, television and radio personality (and Libertarian Party nominee for Vice President in 2008)
 Phil Ruffin, businessman, owner of Treasure Island Hotel and Casino, and partner of Trump Hotel Las Vegas
 Lou Sola, Miami yachtbroker and Republican donor 
 Paul Teutul, Sr. Co. founder of Orange County Choppers
 Donald Trump Jr., businessman, son of the candidate
 Eric Trump, businessman and philanthropist, son of the candidate
 Ivanka Trump, businesswoman, writer, and former model, daughter of the candidate
 Dana White, president of Ultimate Fighting Championship
 Steve Wynn, billionaire business magnate, CEO of Wynn Resorts Limited
 Wirt Yerger III, business leader

University and academic figures
Current
 A.D Amar, Professor of Management at the W. Paul Stillman School of Business, Seton Hall University, South Orange, NJ
 Peter Navarro, Professor of Economics and Public Policy at the Paul Merage School of Business, University of California, Irvine
 Walid Phares, Lebanese-born American professor at the National Defense University and Daniel Morgan Academy in Washington, member of the foreign policy advising committee for the Trump campaign

Former
 Ben Carson, retired Johns Hopkins neurosurgeon and former 2016 presidential candidate

International political figures

National ministers and secretaries
 David Johnston, Australian Senator for the Liberal Party and Former Minister for Defence

Members of national and supranational parliaments
 Gilbert Collard, French MP, member of the Rassemblement Bleu Marine (RBM)
 Filip Dewinter, Belgian politician, Flemish MP and member of the Flemish nationalist Vlaams Belang
 Mark Latham, Australian politician, former MP, former Leader of the Opposition, author of Civilising Global Capital, and member and former leader of the social democratic Australian Labor Party
 Ilias Panagiotaros, Greek politician, MP, and member of the nationalist and Metaxist Golden Dawn party
 David Rachline, member of the French Senate, former mayor of Fréjus, and member of the Front National
 Vladimir Zhirinovsky, Russian politician, Vice Chairman of the State Duma and leader of the Liberal Democratic Party of Russia

Regional ministers, legislators, and party leaders
 Nigel Farage, Former leader (twice) and current interim leader of the UK Independence Party (2006–2009, 2010–2016, Interim leader 2016-), Gave a speech at one Trump rally but never officially endorsed him due to Farage previously being critical of Barack Obama for endorsing Remain pre. Brexit. (Previously supported Rand Paul)
 Pauline Hanson, Australian politician, leader of Pauline Hanson's One Nation and Senator for the state of Queensland
 Jean-Marie Le Pen, French politician, MEP, founder and former leader of the souverainist Front National
 Henry de Lesquen, French politician, candidate for President of French Republic in 2017, founder and president of French National Liberal party
 Robert Ménard, French independent politician (supported by the Front National) and Mayor of Béziers, France
 Mischaël Modrikamen, Belgian politician, leader of the People's Party
 Tomio Okamura, Czech politician, leader of Freedom and Direct Democracy
 Andrey Rostenko, Russian politician, Mayor of Yalta, Crimea
 Matteo Salvini, Italian politician, MEP, leader of the secessionist Lega Nord
 Vojislav Šešelj, Serbian politician, founder and leader of the Serbian Radical Party
 Andrej Šiško, leader of the right-wing Movement of United Slovenia
 Tom Van Grieken, Belgian politician, Flemish MP and leader of the Flemish nationalist Vlaams Belang
 Geert Wilders, Dutch politician, MP, and leader of the national liberal Party for Freedom

Organizations

 American Freedom Party
 National Black Republican Association
 Rent Is Too Damn High Party

Trade unions
 National Border Patrol Council, largest border patrol union in U.S, representing 16,000 members. (first presidential endorsement in history)
 New England Police Benevolent Association

Religious leaders
 Mark Burns, pastor and co-founder of the South Carolina-based Christian TV network, The NOW Network
 Jerry Falwell, Jr., president of Liberty University
 Robert Jeffress, pastor of First Baptist Church in Dallas, Texas
 Emmanuel Lemelson, Greek Orthodox priest in New Hampshire
 James F. Linzey, ordained minister in the Southern Baptist Convention
 James David Manning, chief pastor at the ATLAH World Missionary Church
 Mike Murdock, singer-songwriter, televangelist and pastor of the Wisdom Center ministry

Other notable individuals

Actors and comedians

 Kirstie Alley, actress, comedian and spokesmodel
 Scott Baio, actor (previously endorsed Scott Walker)
 Stephen Baldwin, actor
 Gary Busey, actor
 Robert Davi, actor, singer, and director
 Lou Ferrigno, actor and bodybuilder
 Jerry Lewis, comedian, actor, singer, producer, screenwriter, and director
 Amy Lindsay, actress and former softcore pornographic film performer
 Brandi Love, adult model and pornographic actress
 Jim Norton, comedian, actor, radio host
 Jean-Claude Van Damme, Belgian actor, martial artist, screenwriter, film producer, and director
 Jon Voight, actor
 Fred Williamson, actor

Athletes and sports figures

 Rocky Boiman, former NFL linebacker, talk radio host
 Tom Brady, NFL quarterback
 Adrien Broner, professional boxer
 Clay Buchholz, MLB pitcher
 Zeb Colter, professional wrestling manager
 John Daly, professional golfer
 Johnny Damon, retired MLB player
 Ted DiBiase, former professional wrestler
 Mike Ditka, retired NFL player, coach and television commentator
 Bernie Ecclestone, CEO Formula One, UK Labour Party Member
 Bill Elliott, retired NASCAR driver
 Chase Elliott, NASCAR driver
 Natalie Gulbis, professional golfer on the U.S.-based LPGA Tour.
 Hulk Hogan, former professional wrestler
 Holly Holm, mixed martial artist
 Lou Holtz, Hall of Fame college football coach
 Richie Incognito,  NFL player
 Gene Keady, college basketball coach
 Bob Knight, Hall of Fame college basketball coach
 Jerry Lawler, professional wrestler
 Matt Light, retired NFL offensive tackle
 Nick Mangold, All-Pro NFL center for the New York Jets
 Mark Martin, retired NASCAR driver
 Shawne Merriman, retired NFL linebacker
 Ryan Newman, NASCAR driver
 Paul O'Neill, retired MLB baseball player
 Terrell Owens, retired NFL wide receiver and television personality
 Billy Packer, former college basketball player and color analyst
 Digger Phelps, former college basketball coach
 David Ragan, NASCAR driver
 John Rocker, retired MLB baseball player
 Dennis Rodman, retired professional basketball player and television personality
 Rex Ryan, NFL head coach for the Buffalo Bills, also former head coach for the New York Jets
 Chael Sonnen, retired UFC fighter, ESPN commentator and actor
 Latrell Sprewell, retired NBA All-Star basketball player
 Miesha Tate, former UFC women's bantamweight champion
 Mike Tyson, former professional boxer, actor
 Kevin Von Erich, former professional wrestler
 Herschel Walker, retired NFL player and MMA fighter
 Chris Weidman, former UFC middleweight champion

Political strategists
 Alex Castellanos, Cuban American political consultant. He has worked on electoral campaigns for Republican candidates including Bob Dole, George W. Bush, Jeb Bush and Mitt Romney.

Commentators, writers and columnists

 Conrad Black, Canadian-born British citizen, convicted criminal, former newspaper publisher and author
 Ann Coulter, political commentator and writer
 Adam Curry, political commentator and former MTV VJ
 Lou Dobbs, American television personality, author, radio host and host of Lou Dobbs Tonight on Fox Business
 Alexander Dugin, Russian political scientist, author of The Foundations of Geopolitics and The Fourth Political Theory and member of the Russian nationalist Eurasia Party
 Dmitri K. Kiselyov, head of government-owned Russian news agency Rossiya Segodnya (Russia Today) on channel Rossiya 1
 Paul J. Manafort, Trump campaign chairman, lobbyist, senior Republican political consultant, former director of the Center for the Study of Democratic Institutions, former consultant to ousted Ukrainian President Viktor Yanukovych
 Gavin McInnes, writer, creative director, actor, comedian, and co-founder of Vice Media and Proud Boys
 Michael Scheuer, political blogger, author and former Chief of the Bin Laden Issue Station
 Hossein Shariatmadari,  Iranian conservative journalist and editor-in-chief of Kayhan
 Jared Taylor, white nationalist and political writer, founder of American Renaissance magazine
 Daryush Valizadeh, author, columnist, owner of Return of Kings website
 Diana West, author and columnist
 Milo Yiannopoulos, British journalist and political commentator

Media personalities and socialites
 Dan Bilzerian, professional poker player, media personality (previously endorsed Rand Paul)
 Diamond and Silk, YouTube personalities
 Teresa Giudice, television personality from The Real Housewives of New Jersey who worked with Trump on The Celebrity Apprentice
 Jesse James, television personality and former CEO of Austin Speed Shop
 Charlotte Laws, television host and author
 Steve Malzberg, host of The Steve Malzberg Show on Newsmax TV
 Omarosa Manigault, reality television show personality, and Baptist minister
 Dennis Michael Lynch, host of Unfiltered on Newsmax TV and founder and CEO of TV360
 Judy Shalom Nir-Mozes, Israeli socialite and TV personality
 FPSRussia, YouTube personality
 Jeanine Pirro, judge, TV show host, and host of Justice with Judge Jeanine on Fox News Channel
 Tila Tequila, model, actress and television personality
 Ivana Trump, ex-wife of the candidate, socialite and former athlete and fashion model
 Melania Trump, wife of the candidate, jewelry and watch designer and former fashion model
 Kendra Wilkinson, glamour model, businesswoman, and television personality
 Melissa Young, Miss Wisconsin 2005

Radio hosts

 John Fredericks, radio host
 Alex Jones, radio host (previously endorsed Rand Paul)
 Lars Larson, radio host

Singers and musicians

 Azealia Banks, rapper and singer-songwriter
 Zoltan Bathory, guitarist of Five Finger Death Punch
 Jesse Hughes, singer, songwriter and guitarist, best known as frontman of the California-based rock band Eagles of Death Metal
 White Dawg, Dirty South Crunk rapper
 Young Dro, hip hop recording artist
 Loretta Lynn, country music singer-songwriter
 Justin Moore, singer and songwriter
 Wayne Newton, entertainer and singer
 Ted Nugent, musician, singer-songwriter and political activist
 Kid Rock, musician, actor (previously endorsed Ben Carson)
 Gene Simmons, musician, KISS
 Sergey 'Pauk' Troitsky, leader of Russian thrash metal band Corrosia Metalla

Social and political activists
 Christopher Barron, founder of LGBT for Trump
 Day Gardner, founder and president of The National Black Pro Life Union and Associate Director of National Pro-Life Center
 Jim Gilchrist, leader and co-founder of the Minuteman Project
 Jimmy McMillan, former New York City mayoral and New York gubernatorial candidate (Rent Is Too Damn High Party)
 Phyllis Schlafly, conservative activist and founder of the Eagle Forum
 Orly Taitz, conservative activist and conspiracy theorist, leading promoter of "birther" movement

Newspapers and websites
 Drudge Report, conservative websites
 National Enquirer, supermarket tabloid
 New York Observer, new website
 New York Post, daily newspaper
 Santa Barbara News-Press, broadsheet newspaper

Other
 Juanita Broaddrick, former nursing home administrator, accused Bill Clinton of rape
 Paula Jones, former Arkansas state employee, accused Bill Clinton of sexual harassment

General campaign endorsements
 List of Donald Trump presidential campaign endorsements, 2016

See also
 Newspaper endorsements in the United States presidential primaries, 2016
 List of Donald Trump presidential campaign endorsements, 2016

References 

Trump, Donald
Endorsements
2016 United States presidential election endorsements
Endorsements, 2016